Presidential elections were held in Honduras in 1881. The result was a victory for the Liberal candidate, incumbent President Marco Aurelio Soto, who received 82% of the vote.

Results

References

Honduras
1881 in Honduras
Presidential elections in Honduras
Election and referendum articles with incomplete results